National Route 305 (N305) forms a part of the Philippine highway network. It is a secondary road that acts as a four-lane spur road that spans  and consists two major streets in Olongapo, serving as the main road of Olongapo city proper.

Route description
Route N305 was constructed by the United States Government when the Olongapo was a Naval Reservation. U.S. Navy personnel used the route to provide access to Manila while the U.S. Naval Base Subic Bay existed in Olongapo.

Magsaysay Drive
N305 starts at the Magsaysay Bridge as its southern terminus, a pedestrian walkway that used to be a roadway for vehicles, then provided access to the Subic Bay Freeport Zone until 2011 when SM City Olongapo was built. The route is entirely a one-way road for northbound vehicles. Magsaysay Drive ends at the Friendship Rotunda, a roundabout intersection that was built in the 1970s.

Rizal Avenue
Going further north, N305 continues the route after the Friendship Rotunda, as Rizal Avenue. the Bajac-Bajac Bridge also crosses the route. N305 terminates north at the Ulo ng Apo roundabout – intersecting with other major roads of Jose Abad Santos Avenue (N3) and Olongapo–Bugallon Road (N306).

Maintenance 
N305 was maintain by the City Government of Olongapo and the Department of Public Works and Highways.

Enforcement 
The route was equipped with CCTV camera, traffic cones and proper traffic signage to provide safety features and guide direction for motorist. the whole route has assigned traffic personnel enforced by Office of the Traffic Management and Public Safety.

Intersections

Rizal Avenue 
 Sta Rita Intersection
 26th Street West Junction
 25th Street (OCES) West Junction
 24th Street Intersection
 23rd Street (City Hall) West Junction
 22nd Street East Junction
 Rizal Triangle Junction
 20th Street Intersection
 Ulo ng Apo Rotunda

Rizal Avenue Extension 
 Hospital Road - Anonas Street Intersection (known as SM City Olongapo Central Intersection)
 16th Street Intersection
 14th Street (Jackson) Intersection
 12th Street Intersection
 11th Street West Junction
 9th Street (Wesley) Intersection
 Friendship Rotunda

Magsaysay Drive (North to South) 
 Fendler Street Intersection
 Gallagher Street East Junction
 Hansen - 3rd Street Intersection (Police Station 3)
 Gordon Avenue - 1st Street Intersection (Magsaysay Drive Main Crossing)
 Main Gate - Columban Junction (end of Magsaysay Drive)

References

Roads in Zambales